John Tesshin Sanderson is a Soto Zen roshi of the White Plum Asanga and spiritual director of the Centro Zen de México in Coyoacán, Mexico City, one of only twelve Dharma Successors of the late Taizan Maezumi. He moved to Mexico in 1987 at the request of Maezumi, and has been teaching there ever since.

He is also the spiritual director of the Comunidad Budista Zen Jardín de Luz" in Spain.

References

Sources

External links
Centro Zen de Mexico A.R.

Soto Zen Buddhists
White Plum Asanga
Rōshi
American Zen Buddhists
Living people
Year of birth missing (living people)